is a railway station in Shinjuku, Tokyo Prefecture, Japan. Its station number is M-11.

Platforms

Yotsuya-sanchōme Station consists of two side platforms. Platform one is for trains to Shinjuku, Ogikubo and Nakano-Fujimichō, and platform two for trains to Ginza and Ikebukuro. As of 2011, there has been an underground passageway connecting both platforms.

History 
Yotsuya-sanchōme Station opened on 15 March 1959.

The station facilities were inherited by Tokyo Metro after the privatization of the Teito Rapid Transit Authority (TRTA) in 2004.

Surrounding area
The station is underneath the intersection of National Route 20 (Kōshū Kaidō / Shinjuku-dōri) and Tokyo Metropolitan Route 319 (Gaien-Higashi-dōri). Other points of interest include:
 Yotsuya Police Station
 Tokyo Fire Museum
 NTT Yotsuya Building
 Sōka Gakkai headquarters
 Toei Shinjuku Line Akebonobashi Station (8 minutes walk north)
 JR East Chūō-Sōbu Line Shinanomachi Station (10 minutes walk south)

Connecting bus service
Stop: Yotsuya-Sanchome
 Shina 97 for Shinagawa Station, Shinjuku Station (west exit)
 Sō 81 for Sōdai-seimon (Waseda University), Shibuya Station (east exit)
 Night express for Mitaka Station (north exit)

Line
 Tokyo Metro - Tokyo Metro Marunouchi Line

References

External links

 Tokyo Metro: Yotsuya-sanchome Station 

Railway stations in Japan opened in 1959
Stations of Tokyo Metro
Tokyo Metro Marunouchi Line
Railway stations in Tokyo